Burchuladze is a Georgian surname which may refer to:

Ermil Burchuladze, Georgian historian, Rector of Tbilisi State University (Sep. 1953 - Sep. 1954).
Paata Burchuladze, Georgian opera bass and singer
Tengiz Burchuladze, Georgian mathematician
Zaza Burchuladze, Georgian dramatist and writer

References

Georgian-language surnames